The Embassy of the Islamic Republic of Iran in the Democratic People's Republic of Korea is the diplomatic mission of Iran to North Korea. It is located in Munhungdong, Monsu Street, Taedongkang District, Pyongyang. The current ambassador is Seyed Mohsen Emadi.

History
Under the Pahlavi Dynasty, Iran only had an embassy in South Korea. In 1982, three years after the Islamic Republic of Iran was established, Iran also established an embassy in North Korea.

See also

 List of diplomatic missions of Iran
 List of diplomatic missions in North Korea
 Ar-Rahman Mosque

References

Pyongyang
Iran–North Korea relations
Iran